Welcome to My Nightmare is the debut solo album by American rock musician Alice Cooper, released on March 11, 1975. It is his only album for the Atlantic Records label in North America; in the rest of the world, it was released on the ABC subsidiary Anchor Records (also his only album for that label). Welcome to My Nightmare is a concept album. Played in sequence, the songs form a journey through the nightmares of a child named Steven. The album inspired the Alice Cooper: The Nightmare TV special, a worldwide concert tour in 1975, and his Welcome to My Nightmare concert film in 1976. The ensuing tour was one of the most over-the-top excursions of that era. Most of Lou Reed’s band joined Cooper for this record.

The cover artwork was created by Drew Struzan for Pacific Eye & Ear. Rolling Stone would later rank it ninetieth on the list of the "Top 100 Album Covers Of All Time". Famed horror movie star Vincent Price provided a monologue in the song "The Black Widow". The original version of "Escape" was recorded by The Hollywood Stars for their shelved 1974 album Shine Like a Radio, which was finally released in 2013. The ballad "Only Women Bleed", released as a single, is a song originally composed by guitarist Dick Wagner for his late-1960s band The Frost, with a new title provided by Cooper and revised lyrics written by Wagner and Cooper. The song "Escape" was a rewrite of a song by The Hollywood Stars from the album Shine Like a Radio - The Great Lost 1974 Album. The remastered CD version adds three alternate version bonus tracks.

A sequel concept album, Welcome 2 My Nightmare, was released in 2011.

Background
The Alice Cooper band broke up by Spring of 1974, with Cooper beginning work on his first solo project. Cooper intended the music to be more theatrical than the previous glam-rock focused records. Cooper hired Bob Ezrin, who had produced four previous Cooper records, to collaborate with him. The album is a concept album, with Cooper telling the story of the nightmares of the character Steven. Ezrin, Steve Hunter, and Dick Wagner had all performed on the Alice Cooper band’s 1973 album Billion Dollar Babies, produced by Ezrin. Subsequently, Ezrin produced and performed on Lou Reed’s 1973 concept album Berlin, including Hunter, Wagner, and Tony Levin. Reed’s band on his following live album Rock 'n' Roll Animal was composed of Hunter, Wagner, Prakash John, and Pentti Glan. Ezrin and Cooper hired all four members of Reed’s live band, plus Levin, to work on Cooper’s new album. Wagner and Ezrin would co-write the majority of the tracks with Cooper.

Style
The album has been described as featuring rock and hard rock.

The opening track has been referred to as "Disco flavored". "Only Women Bleed" is a ballad, and "Some Folks" has been compared to cabaret.

Reception

Welcome to My Nightmare received generally mixed reviews upon release. Dave Marsh of Rolling Stone called the album "a TV soundtrack that sounds like one. The horn parts are so corny you might imagine that you're listening to the heavy-metal Ann-Margret." He noted the absence of the original Alice Cooper band, stating, "without the wildness and drive of the sound the Cooper troupe had, the gimmicks on which Alice the performer must rely are flat and obvious." He concluded by saying that it "is simply a synthesis of every mildly wicked, tepidly controversial trick in the Cooper handbook. But in escaping from the mask of rock singer which he claimed he found so confining, Cooper has found just another false face."

In addition, Robert Christgau rated the album a B− grade, stating that it "actually ain't so bad – no worse than all the others". He stated that the varying compositions of the songs would potentially cause the album to influence younger listeners, saying: "Alice's nose for what the kids want to hear is as discriminating as it is impervious to moral suasion, so perhaps this means that the more obvious feminist truisms have become conventional wisdom among at least half our adolescents."

A retrospective review by AllMusic's Greg Prato was more positive. Prato considered the album Cooper's best solo work, despite the absence of the original band: "While the music lost most of the gritty edge of the original AC lineup, Welcome to My Nightmare remains Alice's best solo effort – while some tracks stray from his expected hard rock direction, there's plenty of fist-pumping rock to go around." However, he maintained that "the rockers serve as the album's foundation – 'Devil's Food', 'The Black Widow', 'Department of Youth', and 'Cold Ethyl' are all standouts, as is the more tranquil yet eerie epic 'Steven'." He concluded by comparing the album to Cooper's subsequent solo efforts by stating: "Despite this promising start to Cooper's solo career, the majority of his subsequent releases were often not as focused and were of varying quality." The New York Times, describing the subsequent tour, said that Cooper was much tougher than he looked in concert.

Since its release, Welcome to My Nightmare has become the most-represented album in Alice Cooper's concert setlists, accounting for, even including concerts from before its release, 15.7 percent of all the songs he has played live – a proportion which of course will be much larger counting only shows since the album's composition and release. It is the last album from which every song has been performed live, although "The Awakening" was never played until the Trash Tour on November 21, 1989; while "Some Folks" and "Escape" were never performed after the album's support tour apart from a handful of performances of the latter song in 2001. Alice started playing "Escape" again on his 2019/20 Ol’ Black Eyes Is Back Tour.

Welcome to my Nightmare tour
In July 1975 Alice fell off stage in front of an audience of 17,000. He puts this down to his drinking at the time. He had 15 stitches to his head. Three days later he collapsed on stage after 25 minutes, after ignoring doctors' advice.

Track listing

Personnel
 Alice Cooper – lead vocals
 Dick Wagner – electric and acoustic guitar, vocals
 Steve "Deacon" Hunter – electric and acoustic guitar
 Prakash John – bass
 Pentti "Whitey" Glan – drums
Additional personnel 
 Bob Ezrin – synthesizer, keyboards, vocals, producer
 Jozef Chirowski – keyboards, clavinet, vocals, Fender Rhodes
 Tony Levin – bass on "Welcome to My Nightmare" and "Escape"
 Johnny "Bee" Badanjek – drums on "Welcome to My Nightmare" and "Escape"
 Vincent Price – The Curator
Trish McKinnon – "Mom"
David Ezrin, Gerry Lyons, Michael Sherman, The Summerhill Children's Choir – vocals
Bob Ezrin, Allan Macmillan – arrangements
Technical
 Jeffrey Morgan – liner notes (reissue)
Michael Sherman – production assistant
 Phil Ramone – engineer on "Only Women Bleed", recording at A&R Studios
Corky Stasiak, Dave Palmer, Ed Sprigg, Rod O'Brien – recording at Record Plant East and Electric Lady Studios
Dave Palmer, Jim Frank – recording at Soundstage
 Drew Struzan – artwork

Chart positions

Weekly charts

Year-end charts

Certifications

Stage adaptation
Cooper talked with Rolling Stone over the theatrical adaptation of his album, although there has been little traction on this since 2010.

Cover versions
The 1999 tribute album Humanary Stew: A Tribute to Alice Cooper includes covers of "Cold Ethyl" by Vince Neil, Mick Mars, Mike Inez, Billy Sheehan and Simon Phillips and "The Black Widow" by Bruce Dickinson, Adrian Smith, Tony Franklin, Tommy Aldridge and David Glen Eisley. The album also includes covers of the title track and "Only Women Bleed". All four tracks also feature the album's producer, Bob Kulick.

References

External links
 Alice Cooper Welcome To My Nightmare Tour Program
 Alice Cooper Welcome To My Nightmare on Original Album Cover Art

Alice Cooper albums
1975 albums
Atlantic Records albums
Rock operas
Albums produced by Bob Ezrin
Concept albums
Albums with cover art by Drew Struzan
Albums recorded at Electric Lady Studios